Joe Frazier vs. George Foreman, billed as The Sunshine Showdown, was a professional boxing match in Kingston, Jamaica contested on January 22, 1973, for the WBA, WBC and The Ring heavyweight championships.

Background
In a matchup between two undefeated future hall-of-famers, undisputed heavyweight champion Joe Frazier and the number one-ranked heavyweight George Foreman reached an agreement in November 1972 for a January title fight at the National Stadium in Kingston, Jamaica. Frazier was 29–0 and had won 10 consecutive heavyweight title fights at the time of his match with Foreman, first winning the NYSAC heavyweight title in 1968 and defending that title four times before knocking out Jimmy Ellis to claim the vacant WBA and WBC titles in 1970 that had been stripped from Muhammad Ali. Frazier's most notable defense would come against Ali himself in what was billed as the "Fight of the Century". After defeating Ali by unanimous decision, Frazier captured The Ring heavyweight title and became recognized as the lineal champion. Between his first Ali fight and his bout with Foreman, Frazier successfully defended his title twice against fringe contenders Terry Daniels and Ron Stander. Following his knockout of Stander, Ali attempted to gain a rematch with Frazier, but Frazier ultimately agreed to face Foreman. The undefeated Foreman had accumulated 37 victories in just four years and was ranked number one by both the WBA and WBC at the time of landing his first title match against Frazier.

The fight
The fight lasted only two rounds, with Foreman scoring a technical knockout at 1:35 of the second round to dethrone Frazier and become the new undisputed heavyweight champion. Foreman brutalized Frazier for the duration of the fight, scoring six knockdowns over the champion. In ABC's television re-broadcast, Howard Cosell made the legendary exclamation: "Down goes Frazier! Down goes Frazier! Down goes Frazier!" Less than two minutes into the fight, Foreman stunned Frazier with a series of punches and then sent him down to the canvas with a right uppercut. Frazier was able to get back up but Foreman would continue his dominance and with seventeen seconds left in the round, Foreman caught Frazier with an uppercut that brought him to his knees. Shortly after Frazier rose from that knockdown, a combination from Foreman put the champion on his back and he barely made it out of the round.

Frazier went out for the second round but Foreman knocked him down again shortly after the round began with an overhand right. Foreman then looked toward the champion's corner and was reported to say to Yancey Durham, Frazier's long time trainer, that if he did not step in and stop the fight, Foreman was going to “kill” Frazier. This was followed by a fifth knockdown, and then just as quickly Frazier fell a sixth time after a powerful right. By this time Angelo Dundee, who was at ringside scouting the bout, was pleading for the bout to be stopped. Referee Arthur Mercante, Sr. finally called a halt to the bout after the sixth knockdown, and Foreman was declared the winner at 1:35 of the second round, to become, at the time, the third-youngest heavyweight champion in history (after Floyd Patterson and Muhammad Ali).

Aftermath
Foreman would successfully defend his titles twice in dominating fashion. First he knocked out José Roman in the first round on September 1, 1973. He would follow this by knocking out another future hall-of-famer in the second round in Ken Norton. Foreman would lose the titles in his third defense, against Muhammad Ali in one of the most famous fights in boxing history dubbed "The Rumble in the Jungle."

Frazier returned to the ring in July 1973, where he defeated Joe Bugner by decision in a twelve round bout. This set up a second fight with Ali in January 1974, which Frazier lost by decision. He would fight for the heavyweight title one more time before he retired, facing Ali in the “Thrilla in Manila” in 1975 in an unsuccessful attempt to regain what he had lost to Foreman.

In subsequent years, Cosell's shout of "Down goes Frazier!" became something of a catchphrase (usually in a humorous context), most notably by Keith Olbermann, who would often use it while narrating clips of people or animals stumbling, tripping or otherwise falling down.

References

1973 in boxing
World Boxing Association heavyweight championship matches
World Boxing Council heavyweight championship matches
1973 in Jamaica
January 1973 sports events in North America
Boxing in Jamaica
Boxing on HBO
Boxing matches